Nancy Stiles is an American school nutrition manager and former Republican member of the New Hampshire State Senate representing the 24th district.

Background

Born in New Bedford, Massachusetts, Stiles earned a Bachelor of Business degree from the University of New Hampshire.

For thirty years before her retirement, Stiles worked as a director of food services and as school nutrition director for the Hampton School District. She also taught food service management for the University of New Hampshire. Stiles has chaired the Public Policy and Legislation Committee of the American School Food Service Association.

Legislative service
Stiles served in the New Hampshire House of Representatives for the 15th Rockingham County District, first winning the seat in 2004 and being re-elected in 2006 and 2008. She served on the standing committee on Education.

On November 2, 2010, Stiles won election to the New Hampshire State Senate.  She faced no opposition in her primary and defeated Democratic incumbent Martha Fuller Clark in the general election with 11,594 votes to Clark's 11,056. She chairs the Senate's standing committee on education, and is also assigned to the committees on public affairs and on transportation.

In 2013, Stiles was a signatory to an amicus curiae brief submitted to the Supreme Court in support of same-sex marriage during the Hollingsworth v. Perry case.

Personal
She and her husband Howard have three children. They live in Hampton, New Hampshire.

References

External links
Stiles' Senate website
Project Vote Smart legislative profile
Project Vote Smart biography
2004 campaign contributions
2006 campaign contributions
2008 campaign contributions

Year of birth missing (living people)
Living people
Republican Party New Hampshire state senators
Republican Party members of the New Hampshire House of Representatives
Women state legislators in New Hampshire
People from Hampton, New Hampshire
Politicians from New Bedford, Massachusetts
University of New Hampshire alumni
University of New Hampshire faculty
American women academics
21st-century American women